Scotomera caesarealis is a species of snout moth. It is found on Cyprus and in Turkey and Syria.

References

Moths described in 1891
Pyralini
Insects of Turkey